Sam Mintz (July 12, 1897 – September 13, 1957) was an American screenwriter from Russia during the Russian Empire period, who was nominated in the category of Best Adapted Screenplay at the 4th Academy Awards. He was nominated alongside Joseph L. Mankiewicz. They were nominated for Skippy.

He wrote nearly 40 screenplays during his career.

Selected filmography
 Shootin' Irons (1927)
 Daring Daughters (1933)
 A Glimpse of Paradise (1934)
 Chatterbox (1936)

References

External links

1897 births
1957 deaths
American male screenwriters
Emigrants from the Russian Empire to the United States
Film people from Minsk
20th-century American male writers
20th-century American screenwriters